Supreme Military Council may refer to:

 Supreme Military Council (Chad)
 Supreme Military Council (Equatorial Guinea)
 Supreme Council of the Armed Forces (Egypt)
 Supreme Military Council (Ghana)
 Supreme Military Council (Nigeria 1966)
 Supreme Military Council (Nigeria 1983)
 Supreme Military Council (Syria)
 Supreme Military Council (Turkey)
 Revolutionary Military Council (1918–1934) in the Soviet Russia (USSR), sometimes referred as Supreme Military Council
 Supreme War Council (Japan)